Oh My Ghost is a 2015 South Korean television series starring Park Bo-young, Jo Jung-suk, Lim Ju-hwan and Kim Seul-gi. It aired on tvN from July 3 to August 22, 2015, on Fridays and Saturdays at 20:30 (KST) for 16 episodes.

Synopsis
Na Bong-sun (Park Bo-young) has an extremely timid personality and low self-esteem, doesn't have any close friends, and is constantly getting reprimanded at her job as an assistant chef at Sun Restaurant. She also occasionally sees ghosts, thanks to a shaman grandmother. One day, Bong-sun gets possessed by a lustful virgin ghost named Shin Soon-ae (Kim Seul-gi). To make up for the lack of romance in her short life and believing that only by losing her virginity will she be able to "resolve her grudge" and move on to the afterlife, Soon-ae is determined to seduce as many men as she can by possessing various women, and she finds the perfect vessel in Bong-sun.

Bong-sun's boss is arrogant star chef Kang Sun-woo (Jo Jung-suk), whom she secretly has a crush on. Sun-woo hasn't dated anyone since getting his heart broken by his college friend Lee So-hyung (Park Jung-ah), who's a TV producer. But when Bong-sun seemingly gets rid of her shyness and suddenly changes into a confident, dynamic woman, she finally catches his eye. Meanwhile, the mystery surrounding Soon-ae's death involves Sun-woo's brother-in-law, a kind police officer, Choi Sung-jae (Lim Ju-hwan), who may not be what he seems.

Cast
 Park Bo-young as Na Bong-sun
 Assistant chef at Sun Restaurant. She is shy, insecure, and always has a low self-esteem. Her life changes when she is possessed by Shin Soon Ae, which makes her seem more cheerful. She studied to be a Chef under Kang Sun-woo, and then she studied abroad after winning a cooking contest.
 Jo Jung-suk as Kang Sun-woo
 The owner and head chef of Sun Restaurant, a professional chef specializing in pasta. He also opened a small restaurant with Korean fusion food. He has a not very good relationship with his mother but loves his sister very much.
 Lim Ju-hwan as Choi Sung-jae
 A kind police officer. But actually, he is possessed by an evil spirit. He was the one who killed Shin Soon-ae because Soon-ae was an eyewitness when he was involved in the hit and run. Kang Eun-hee's husband.
 Kim Seul-gi as Shin Soon-ae
 A ghost who's still hanging around because she hasn't finished her grudge. She thought that her grudge was being a virgin ghost, but in the end, she realized that her grudge was caused by an unjust death. She was killed by Choi Sung-jae.
 Park Jung-ah as Lee So-hyung
 A television Program Director and Kang Sun-woo's first love.
 Shin Hye-sun as Kang Eun-hee
 The younger sister of Kang Sun-woo, a former ballerina who became the victim of a hit and run that left her paralyzed. Worked as a Cashier at Sun Restaurant.
 Kang Ki-young as Heo Min-soo
 Sous Chef at Sun Restaurant.
 Choi Min-chul as Jo Dong-chul
 Chef at Sun Restaurant.
 Kwak Si-yang as Seo Joon
 Chef at Sun Restaurant. He studied at Le Cordon Bleu.
 Oh Eui-shik as Choi Ji-woong
 Chef at Sun Restaurant.
 Shin Eun-kyung as Jo Hye-young
 Kang Sun Woo's mother, a teaching professor. She gave birth to Kang Sun-woo at the age of 19, then worked while studying. She has no female friends because she was too busy dating and studying, and her only female friend is Seobinggo.
 Lee Dae-yeon as Shin Myung-ho
 Shin Soon-ae's father. He runs a small restaurant whose main customers are taxi drivers.
 Lee Hak-joo as Shin Kyung-mo
 Shin Soon-ae's younger brother. He is unemployed who only spends his time playing games. Later, he worked at Kang Sun-woo's second restaurant.
 Lee Jung-eun as Shaman in Seobinggo-dong
 A shaman. Jo Hye-young's only female friend. She also close to Shin Soon-ae's ghost.
 Kim Sung-bum as Han Jin-goo
 A police officer in charge of the hit-and-run case of Kang Eun-hee. He is Choi Sung-jae's partner. Later, he was killed by Choi Sung-jae.
 Choi Woong as Joo Chang-gyu / Yoon Chang-sub
 So-hyung's late boyfriend and So-hyung's new boyfriend (double role).
 Lee Joo-sil as Bong-sun's grandmother
 A shaman.

Special appearances
 Oh Hee-joon as Dormitory occupant
 Lee Do-yeop as pension owner
 Lee Ha-na as radio DJ (voice cameo) (ep. 1)
 Kim Hwan-hee as Yoon Chae-hee (ep. 8)
 Ryu Hyun-kyung as Officer Kang (ep. 13–14)
 Seo In-guk as Edward (ep. 16)
 Nam Gi-ae as Seo Bing-go's customer (ep. 16)
 Park Ji-yeon as Il Pal-gwi a ghost friend of virginal ghost, Shin Soon-ae

Original Soundtrack

Part 1

Part 2

Part 3

Part 4

OST Special

Ratings
In this table,  represent the lowest ratings and  represent the highest ratings.

Awards and nominations

Remake
In September 2018, the Thai remake of the same title premiered on True4U. It stars Nuengthida Sophon as Jiew, Keerati Mahaplearkpong as Khaopun, and  Arak Amornsupasiri as Chef Artit.

References

External links
  
 
 

TVN (South Korean TV channel) television dramas
2015 South Korean television series debuts
2015 South Korean television series endings
South Korean romantic comedy television series
South Korean fantasy television series
South Korean television series remade in other languages
Television series about ghosts
Television series set in restaurants
Works about chefs
Television shows about spirit possession
Television shows set in Seoul
Television series by Chorokbaem Media